Buccaneer State Park is a state park in the U.S. state of Mississippi. It is located off U.S. Highway 90 and Beach Boulevard (Mississippi Highway 606), straddling the line between Waveland and Clermont Harbor. The park sits on the Gulf of Mexico and was entirely rebuilt after all its buildings were destroyed by Hurricane Katrina in 2005.

Activities and amenities
The park features a  waterpark, more than 300 campsites, bathhouses, recreation center, 18-hole disc golf course, picnic area, playground, and  nature trail.

References

External links
Buccaneer State Park Mississippi Department of Wildlife, Fisheries, and Parks

State parks of Mississippi
Protected areas of Hancock County, Mississippi